Kareem Michael McKenzie (born May 24, 1979) is a former American football offensive tackle. As a member of the New York Giants, he won Super Bowl XLII and Super Bowl XLVI, twice against the New England Patriots.

High school and college career
McKenzie played only two years of high school football at Willingboro High School in Willingboro Township, New Jersey. McKenzie played college football at Penn State University.

Professional career

New York Jets (2001–2004)
McKenzie was drafted in the third round (79th overall) of the 2001 NFL Draft by the New York Jets, and established himself as a premier run blocker over his first four seasons as a professional.  McKenzie anchored the right tackle position and helped Curtis Martin achieve three straight 1,000-yard rushing seasons from 2002 to 2004, including an NFL best 1,697 yards in 2004.

New York Giants (2005–2012)
Before the 2005 season, McKenzie joined the New York Giants as a free agent.  He suffered a hamstring injury in week 13 of the 2005 season against Giants rival, the Dallas Cowboys.  McKenzie made an immediate impact as right tackle for the Giants in the 2005 season, paving the way for Tiki Barber in rushing for a franchise-record of 1,860 yards.

McKenzie was an integral part of the Giants' success in 2007 and won his first Super Bowl ring in Super Bowl XLII. He earned another ring with the Giants in Super Bowl XLVI. Following the season, he became a free agent and the Giants announced he would not be re-signed. After his time with the Giants, he did not sign with another team.

References

External links

Kareem McKenzie bio, New York Giants 2011 Information Guide, pp. 119–120.
 Willingboro to the Super Bowl, The Philadelphia Inquirer, February 1, 2008

1979 births
Living people
African-American players of American football
American football offensive tackles
Penn State Nittany Lions football players
New York Giants players
New York Jets players
People from Willingboro Township, New Jersey
Players of American football from Trenton, New Jersey
Willingboro High School alumni
21st-century African-American sportspeople
20th-century African-American sportspeople